Stephan Bibrowski (1890–1932), better known as Lionel the Lion-faced Man, was a famous sideshow performer. His whole body was covered with long hair that gave him the appearance of a lion; this was likely due to a rare condition called hypertrichosis.

Bibrowski was born in 1890 in Wilczogóra, Grójec County at Gmina Belsk Duży in Congress Poland with 2.5 cm hair covering his body. His mother (Benedetta) blamed the condition on the mauling of his father (Michael) by a lion, which she claimed to have witnessed while pregnant with Stephan. She considered Stephan an abomination and gave him up to a German impresario named Sedlmayer when he was four years old. Sedlmayer gave him his stage name and started exhibiting him around Europe.

His body was almost entirely covered with hair, the only exceptions being the palms of his hands and the soles of his feet. In 1901, Lionel traveled to the United States and started appearing with the Barnum and Bailey Circus. He toured with the circus from then on, occasionally going back to Europe.

In his act, Lionel performed gymnastic tricks, and also spoke to people to show his gentle side that sharply contrasted with his appearance. He settled in the U.S. in 1920, becoming a popular attraction, and moved to New York City, where he was a fixture at Coney Island.

By the late 1920s, Lionel retired from his sideshow career and moved back to Germany. He was reported to have died in Berlin from a heart attack in 1932 at forty-one years of age.

References

External links 
 Homberger, Francine (2005). Carny Folk. .

1890s births
1932 deaths
People with hypertrichosis
Sideshow performers
German expatriates in the United States